Watertown Regional Airport , formerly Watertown Municipal Airport, is two miles northwest of Watertown in Codington County, South Dakota, United States.

The National Plan of Integrated Airport Systems for 2015-2019 categorized it as a non-primary commercial service facility. Federal Aviation Administration data says it had 4,348 passenger boardings (enplanements) in calendar year 2013, a decrease of 30.5% from 6,254 enplanements in 2012.

History 
During World War II, the airfield was used by the United States Army Air Forces as a Second Air Force cold weather bomber training base as an auxiliary to Sioux Falls Army Air Field, and by Air Proving Ground Command.

B-17 Flying Fortress and B-24 Liberator units underwent advanced training before going overseas. One unit that trained here was the 702d Bombardment Squadron of the 445th Bombardment Group.

Facilities
The airport covers 919 acres (372 ha) at an elevation of 1,749 feet (533 m). It has two runways: 12/30 is 6,898 by 100 feet (2,102 x 30 m) concrete and 17/35 is 6,893 by 100 feet (2,100 x 30 m) concrete.

In 2013 the airport had 15,200 aircraft operations, an average 42 per day: 72% general aviation, 18% air carrier, and 10% air taxi. At that time 32 aircraft were based at this airport: 69% single-engine, 19% multi-engine, 6% jet, and 6% glider.

From 2012 to 2018, runways 17/35 and 12/30 were overhauled using concrete, replacing worn out asphalt on both runways.

The airport opened its new, state-of-the-art passenger terminal August 10, 2022. The new terminal has two levels, two gates and a movable jet bridge.  

The airport has free parking.

Notable visitors 
President Barack Obama landed at the airport twice, first in 2008 during his presidential campaign, and on May 8, 2015, to address the graduating class of 2015 from Lake Area Technical Institute. Both times, President Obama arrived on a Boeing 757, during his campaign, on a chartered North American Airlines 757, and as president, using a smaller version of Air Force One (the Boeing C-32).

Airlines and destinations

Air service to Watertown is provided by Denver Air Connection using 50-seat Embraer ERJ-145ERs, with daily flights to Chicago and Denver.

Historical airline service 
Airline flights at Watertown started about 1935, with a local company, Watertown Airways, operating scheduled service between Minneapolis–St. Paul International Airport and Watertown. This route continued through South Dakota with additional stops in Huron, Pierre, Phillip, Rapid City, and Spearfish. By 1938, Mid-Continent Airlines was operating a route from Minneapolis-St. Paul to Omaha, Nebraska, with Watertown as one of the intermediate stops. Upon the 1952 acquisition of Mid-Continent by Braniff International, Braniff took over the operation of this route until 1959. North Central arrived in 1957 and successor Republic left in 1985. The first jet flights were North Central DC-9s in 1968.

Mesaba Airlines, operating as Northwest Airlink, and later, Delta Connection, served Watertown for years, with daily Saab 340s to Minneapolis/St. Paul. When Delta quit using the Saab 340 in December 2011, and announced the end of air service to Watertown, flights from Minneapolis temporarily used Delta's Canadair Regional Jet 200, until Great Lakes Airlines took over 4 months later.

Great Lakes Airlines offered daily non-stop 19-seat (later 9-seat) Beechcraft 1900Ds to Minneapolis/St. Paul, until city officials voted to end the service, citing unreliability of the airline. Great Lakes ended service to the airport on September 30, 2015.

On August 15, 2016, Aerodynamics, Inc. (later California Pacific Airlines) began flying to Watertown with daily service to Denver, via Pierre, using Embraer 145 jet aircraft. However, the airline suspended all operations nationwide and ended flights to Pierre and Watertown on January 17, 2019.

Air service to Watertown resumed on April 3, 2019 with SkyWest Airlines operating as United Express, using 50-seat Canadair Regional Jet 200s. $3.24 million (or $44.44 per seat) of annual funding from the Essential Air Service program for flights to Denver ended on June 30, 2021. Denver Air Connection was selected for a new contract starting July 1, 2021; at that time, SkyWest also announced their intentions to remain in the Pierre and Watertown markets. SkyWest ended service to Watertown in January 2022. 

Sun Country Airlines flew several seasonal charter Boeing 737-800s to Laughlin/Bullhead City International Airport in Arizona, known as "casino or gamblers' flights," in coordination with travel agencies in Watertown. These trips ended in 2015.

Statistics

See also 

 South Dakota World War II Army Airfields

References

Other sources 

 
 Essential Air Service documents (Docket OST-2001-10644) from the U.S. Department of Transportation:
 Order 2003-7-4 (July 8, 2003): selects Mesaba Aviation, Inc. d/b/a Northwest Airlink, an affiliate of Northwest Airlines, to provide subsidized essential air service (EAS) for a two-year period at Watertown, South Dakota, at an annual rate of $1,871,825.
 Order 2005-9-9 (September 14, 2005): re-selecting Mesaba Aviation, Inc. d/b/a Northwest Airlink, to provide subsidized essential air service (EAS) for the two-year period beginning August 1, 2005, at Watertown, South Dakota, at an annual rate of $1,211,589.
 Order 2007-8-19 (August 20, 2007): re-selecting Mesaba Aviation, Inc., d/b/a Northwest Airlink, to continue to provide subsidized essential air service (EAS) at Watertown, South Dakota, for the two-year period beginning August 1, 2007. Service will consist of 14 nonstop round trips per week at an annual subsidy rate of $1,189,606, with flights originating and terminating at Pierre and operated with 34-seat Saab 340 aircraft as Northwest Airlink.
 Order 2009-7-15 (July 16, 2009): re-selecting Mesaba Aviation, Inc. d/b/a Delta Connection, to continue providing subsidized essential air service (EAS) at Watertown, SD, for the two-year period beginning August 1, 2009, at the annual subsidy rate of $1,338,321.
 Order 2011-6-6 (June 7, 2011): re-selecting Mesaba Aviation, Inc., operating as Delta Connection, to provide essential air service (EAS) at Watertown, South Dakota. Mesaba will provide two daily nonstop round trips (14 a week) to Minneapolis/St. Paul International Airport (Minneapolis) using 34-seat Saab 340 aircraft for a short-term contract period beginning August 1, 2011, through October 31, 2011, for an annual subsidy of $1,769,019, pro-rated at $450,736 for the contract period.
 Order 2011-9-5 (September 13, 2011): prohibiting suspension of service and requesting proposals.
 Order 2011-11-30 (November 23, 2011): selecting Great Lakes Aviation, Ltd., to provide essential air service (EAS) at six communities at the following annual subsidy rates: Brainerd, Minnesota, $959,865; Fort Dodge, $1,798,693; Iron Mountain, $1,707,841; Mason City, $1,174,468; Thief River Falls, Minnesota, $1,881,815; and Watertown, $1,710,324, for the two-year period beginning when Great Lakes inaugurates full EAS at all six communities
 Order 2014-4-17 (April 18, 2014): reselecting Great Lakes to provide EAS at Watertown, South Dakota using 19 (reconfigured to 9) passenger Beech 1900D aircraft with non-stop service to Minneapolis for 2 round trips each weekday and weekend and one-stop service to Denver for one daily round trip, for a total of 19 per week, for the two-year term from June 1, 2014 through May 31, 2016, for an annual subsidy of $2,847,284.

External links
 Watertown Regional Airport, official website
   from South Dakota DOT Airport Directory
 Aerial image as of August 1991 from USGS The National Map
 
 

Airports in South Dakota
Essential Air Service
Buildings and structures in Codington County, South Dakota
Transportation in Codington County, South Dakota
Watertown, South Dakota
Airfields of the United States Army Air Forces in South Dakota
Airports established in 1943
1943 establishments in South Dakota